Steve Guyger (born September 12, 1952) is an American Chicago blues harmonica player, singer, and songwriter. He has recorded five albums since 1997, having previously backed Jimmy Rogers for almost fifteen years.

Rick Estrin, from Rick Estrin & the Nightcats, referred to Guyger in the liner notes of one of the latter's  albums as "a true master of the blues harmonica." Guyger has played with Rogers, Charlie Musselwhite, Little Sammy Davis and Mark Hummel, and is proficient in both diatonic and chromatic instruments.

Biography
Guyger was born in Philadelphia, and initially studied guitar for five years before his future sister-in-law gave him a harmonica as a gift. Inspired by watching various blues musicians following trips to both New York and Chicago, Guyger formed his own band in the late 1970s.  Personnel came and went and he changed the name of the band to the Excellos in 1980, who steadily built up a growing reputation playing in both Philadelphia and New York. Guyger started backing Jimmy Rogers in 1980, and played with him until just before Rogers' death in 1997. That same year Guyger's debut album, Last Train to Dover, was released.

In 1999, Severn Records released Guyger's third album, Past Life Blues.

In 2008, Guyger performed at the Lucerne Blues Festival. His most recent album, Radio Blues was released in March the same year to critical acclaim. His guest musicians included Johnny Moeller. The following year his work saw Guyger nominated for a Blues Music Award.

In 2010, he issued an instructional DVD, entitled Blues Harmonica, published by the Hal Leonard Corporation. He currently endorses Hohner harmonicas.

Discography

See also
List of electric blues musicians
List of harmonica blues musicians

References

External links
Official website

1952 births
Living people
American blues singers
American blues harmonica players
American male singers
Harmonica blues musicians
Chicago blues musicians
Electric blues musicians
Musicians from Philadelphia
Songwriters from Pennsylvania
Singers from Pennsylvania
Songwriters from Illinois
American male songwriters